The Neversink Preserve is located in Deerpark, Orange County, New York. It was created in 1993 by The Nature Conservancy. They purchased  of land on the Neversink River and created the Neversink Preserve in order to protect the newly discovered and federally endangered species of mussel, the dwarf wedge mussel. Theodore Gordon, considered the father of modern American fly-fishing, perfected his dry-fly techniques here in the 19th century. Nearly 15 million people rely on the waters of the Delaware River Basin for drinking water and industrial use, making the Neversink Preserve a top priority of The Nature Conservancy.

Flora

Trees

Sugar maple
Red maple
River birch
Sycamore
Red oak
Green ash

Wildflowers
Bee balm
Cardinal flower
Dutchman's breeches
Blue flag
Closed gentians
Trout lily
Violet

Fauna

Mammals

Otters and beavers live in the creeks and wetlands that crisscross the preserve.
Bobcats, black bear and wild turkeys inhabit the forests and meadows.

Birds
Common merganser
Wood duck
Osprey
Great blue heron
Belted kingfisher
Bald eagle
Ruffed grouse
Northern harrier
Owl
Warbler

Fish
Brook trout
American shad
Sea lamprey
American eel

Reptiles and amphibians
Spotted salamander
Wood frog
Northern water snake
Ribbon snake
Snapping turtle

See also
 Cuddebackville Dam
 Protected areas of the United States
 List of New York state parks
 International Union for Conservation of Nature
 Conservation

References

Protected areas established in 1993
Neversink River
Protected areas of Orange County, New York
Nature Conservancy preserves in New York (state)